Hailey may refer to:

People
Hailey (given name)
Hailey (surname)

Places
Hailey, Idaho, USA
Hailey, Missouri, USA
Hailey, Oxfordshire, England
Green Hailey, Buckinghamshire, England
Hailey College of Commerce, Lahore, Punjab, Pakistan

Other uses
Baron Hailey, title created in the United Kingdom for the former governor of Punjab
USS Hailey (DD-556), a destroyer for the United States Navy
 "Hailey", a track on The Complete Edition of Justin Bieber's album Justice, titled after his wife, Hailey Baldwin
 Hailey, a brand name of ethinylestradiol/norethisterone acetate, a combined oral contraceptive

See also
Haley (disambiguation)
Halley (disambiguation)
Hayley (disambiguation)